Andrew Rabutla (born 21 November 1971) is a South African former footballer who played at both professional and international levels as a defender.

He was nicknamed "Jaws of Life" because of his tough tackling.

Career
Rabutla played his club football in South Africa and Greece for D'Alberton Callies, Rabali Blackpool, Jomo Cosmos and PAOK. His European career end early after a serious knee injury. Rabutla played with PAOK only one official game for 1997–98 UEFA Cup. Due to his injury his released from PAOK at the middle of the season.

He also earned nineteen caps for the South African national side between 1997 and 2001, scoring one goal. Two of his caps came in FIFA World Cup qualifying matches.
He also took part at the 1998 African Cup of Nations final.

References

1971 births
Living people
South African soccer players
South Africa international soccer players
Jomo Cosmos F.C. players
Association football defenders
1998 African Cup of Nations players
PAOK FC players
South African expatriate soccer players
Expatriate footballers in Greece
South African expatriate sportspeople in Greece
People from Tzaneen
Sportspeople from Limpopo